Willie Wood (1936–2020) was an American football player and coach.

Willie Wood may also refer to:
 Willie Wood (footballer) (1878–1947), English footballer
 Willie Wood (bowler) (born 1938), Scottish bowls player
 Willie Wood (golfer) (born 1960), American golfer

See also
 Willie Woods (1898–1927), American baseball player
 Will Wood (footballer) (born 1996), English footballer
 William Wood (disambiguation)